The Serpent on the Crown is the 17th in a series of historical mystery novels, written by Elizabeth Peters and featuring fictional sleuth and archaeologist Amelia Peabody.

Plot summary
In 1922, the Emersons are excavating at Deir el Medina when a melodramatic visitor delivers a challenge—and a solid gold ancient statuette—to them: find out where it came from and why it brings bad luck to its owners. Emerson, of course, doesn't believe in curses, but he does believe someone has robbed a find of historic proportions. When their visitor turns up dead and her stepchildren disappear, everyone except the Emersons believe the murder is a family affair.

Ramses, meanwhile, finds a papyrus which he suspects to be of historic importance, and an assistant who is not all he seems.

Title
The book's title is from the Poetical Stela of Thutmose III:
"I have robbed their nostrils of the breath of life and made the dread of you fill their hearts. My serpent on your brow consumed them."

See also

List of characters in the Amelia Peabody series

Amelia Peabody
2005 American novels
Historical mystery novels
Fiction set in 1922
Novels set in the 1920s
Novels set in Egypt
HarperCollins books